Graminea inca is a species of beetle in the family Cerambycidae. It was described by Galileo and Martins in 1990. It is known from Peru.

References

Calliini
Beetles described in 1990